Love Is in the Heir is an American reality documentary television series on E! that debuted on November 28, 2004.

Synopsis
The series follows the life of Iranian Princess Ann Claire Van Shaick, the granddaughter of HIH Princess Shams of the Pahlavi Dynasty, and daughter of HH Prince Shahboz Pahlbod and Beatrice Anne. Against her parents wishes, she moves to Los Angeles with the hopes of becoming a country singer. Her parents disapprove of her lifestyle and make repeated attempts to bring her back to London with no success. Ann Claire's father ultimately gives her a time frame in which she has to become a successful country music star or return to her family and enter into an arranged marriage.

Episodes

References

External links
 

2000s American reality television series
2004 American television series debuts
2005 American television series endings
English-language television shows
E! original programming
Television shows set in Los Angeles
Iranian-American culture in California